Paul Jesperson (born December 2, 1992) is an American basketball player for Unión Financiera Baloncesto Oviedo of the Spanish LEB Oro. He played college basketball for the Northern Iowa Panthers.

College career
Jesperson attended Merrill High School where he became the schools all-time leading scorer. Jesperson attended the University of Virginia for two years before transferring to the University of Northern Iowa.

In an NCAA tournament game versus the sixth-seeded University of Texas Jesperson hit a half-court buzzer beating shot to win the game. The shot was featured in the 2016 edition of One Shining Moment.

Freshman season
Jesperson averaged 10.5 minutes, 1.5 points, 0.8 rebounds, and 0.2 assists per game.

Sophomore season
Jesperson averaged 25.7 minutes, 4.7 points, 2.2 rebounds, and 0.9 assists per game.

Junior season
Jesperson averaged 18.2 minutes, 5.9 points, 2.3 rebounds, and 0.3 assists per game.

Senior season
Jesperson averaged 30.3 minutes, 10.8 points, 4.0 rebounds, and 0.9 assists per game.  In the Round of 64, he made a buzzer beater from half court to beat Texas 75-72.

Professional career
After going undrafted in the 2016 NBA draft, Jesperson signed with the Rio Grande Valley Vipers of the NBA Development League on October 31, 2016. On November 15, he made his professional debut in a 152–128 win over the Maine Red Claws, playing two minutes off the bench. Seven days later, he was waived by the Vipers. On November 30, Jesperson signed with Spanish team Oviedo CB until the end of the 2016–17 season. In January 2017, he won with the club the Copa Princesa de Asturias.

References

External links
Northern Iowa Panthers bio

1992 births
Living people
American expatriate basketball people in Spain
American men's basketball players
Basketball players from Wisconsin
Northern Iowa Panthers men's basketball players
Oviedo CB players
People from Merrill, Wisconsin
Rio Grande Valley Vipers players
Shooting guards
Virginia Cavaliers men's basketball players